WOKS AM 1340 is a radio station broadcasting a rhythmic oldies format.  Licensed to serve Columbus, Georgia, United States, the station serves the immediate area around Columbus and suburban Phenix City, Alabama.  The station is currently owned by Davis Broadcasting, Inc. of Columbus.  Its radio studios are co-located with four other sister stations on Wynnton Road in Columbus east of downtown, and its transmitter is located in Columbus southeast of downtown.

In late February 2016, Davis' W243CE FM 96.5, located all the way on the far northeast edge of metro Atlanta, was given a construction permit to move to Columbus. Ordinarily prohibited, the long-distance move is allowed under the FCC's "AM revitalization" program, which allows AM stations (but not other low-power community stations like LPFM) to take existing FM translators and the service they provide away from their current areas and use them to duplicate their own service in the same area the main station already serves, without having to overlap the translator's previous service contour.

References

External links

OKS
Rhythmic oldies radio stations in the United States